Qfusion is a 3D game engine. The project was started by Victor Luchitz along with several others. It is written in C for use on Windows and Unix-based systems. The engine also supports the data of Quake III as maps, 3D models and shaders.

Qfusion is a fork of id Tech 2, popularly known as the Quake II engine. Qfusion is free and open-source software subject to the terms of the GNU GPL-2.0-or-later.

The engine supports Ogg Vorbis sound and KTX (ETC1), TGA, JPEG, PNG for images. More recent versions of Qfusion engine also extend the Q3 rendering scheme to include Normal Mapping, GLSL shaders (including bump mapping and cel shading), and skeletal animation.

Games using Qfusion 
The engine is used by following games:

 Cocaine Diesel 
 Nosferatu
 Warsow
 Warfork

References

External links 
 Directory of Qfusion powered games
 Unofficial website

Free software
Free software programmed in C
Game engines for Linux
Id Tech
Video game engines